This is a list of Pakistani journalists from print and electronic media.

A

 Amin Hafeez
 Ansar Abbasi
 Ayaz Amir
 Abdul Hameed Chapra
 Asma Chaudhry
 Ardeshir Cowasjee
 Altaf Husain
 Arshad Sharif
 Aasma Sherazi
 Abid Qaiyum Suleri
 Akhtar Jamal
 Agha Shorish Kashmiri
 Anthony Mascarenhas
 Asad Ali Toor
 Ayaz Latif Palijo
 Ahmad Nadeem Qasimi
 Ahfaz-ur-Rahman
 Ahmed Rashid
 Ayesha Siddiqa
 Akber Ali Wahidi (1957–2011), sports journalist
 Abdullah Malik (1920–2003)

B

 Siddiq Baloch
 Syed Babar Ali
 Mujahid Barelvi
 Rabiah Jamil Beg
 Sana Bucha
 Meher Bukhari

C

 Chiragh Hasan Hasrat

E

 Eqbal Ahmad

F

 Faysal Aziz Khan
 Muhammad Farooq
 Musharraf Ali Farooqi
 Ian Fyfe

G

 Maulana Ghulam Rasool Mehr
 Ilyas Gadit
 Sabihuddin Ghausi
 Gharida Farooqi

H

 Hasan Abidi
 Zaib-un-Nissa Hamidullah
 Muhammad Izhar ul Haq
 Irshad Ahmed Haqqani
 Khalid Hasan
 Mehdi Hasan
 Zahida Hina
 Irfan Husain
 Mishal Husain
 Saneeya Hussain
 Talat Hussain
 Hamid Mir
 Hasan Nisar

I

 Imran Aslam
 Imran Riaz Khan
 Iftikhar Ahmad
 Mian Iftikharuddin
 Saba Imtiaz
 Jawed Iqbal

J

 Javed Jabbar
 Orya Maqbool Jan
 Nusrat Javed

K

 Hayatullah Khan
 Kamran Khan
 Zafar Ali Khan
 Omar Kureishi
 Kiran Nazish

M

 Minhaj Barna
 Mubasher Lucman
 Moeed Pirzada
 Makhdoom Shahabuddin
 Javed Malik
 Shahid Masood
 Shireen Mazari
 Mushtaq Minhas
 Hamid Mir
 Janbaz Mirza
 Tahir Mirza
 Jugnu Mohsin
 Saima Mohsin
 Malik Siraj Akbar
 Rana Mubashir

N

 Shahid Nadeem
 Naveen Naqvi
 Zarqa Nawaz
 Zamir Niazi
 Hameed Nizami
 Majid Nizami

Q

 Haider Qureshi

R

 Rais Amrohvi
 Mumtaz Hamid Rao
 Shehrbano Rehman

S

 Somy Ali
 Arman Sabir
 Saleem Safi
 Ghazi Salahuddin
 Ahmad Salim
 Shaheen Sehbai
 Shahzeb Khanzada
 Najam Sethi
 Mahmood Shaam
 Bina Shah
 Riaz Shahid
 Syed Saleem Shahzad
 Mehmood Sham
 Muneeza Shamsie
 Kamal Siddiqi
 Z. A. Suleri

T

 Shaukat Thanvi
 Tahir Hanfi

W

 Wajahat Masood
 Waseem Badami

Y

 Rahimullah Yusufzai

Z

 Muhammad Ismail Zabeeh
 Mahbub Jamal Zahedi
 Fasi Zaka
 Zia Ur Rehman
 Nasim Zehra
 Nasira Zuberi
 Iqbal Zuberi

See also

 List of Pakistanis
 List of television reporters
 Lists of writers

References

Pakistani
Journalist